Bang Sin-Bong (born ) is a former South Korean male volleyball player. He was part of the South Korea men's national volleyball team. He competed with the national team at the 2000 Summer Olympics in Sydney, Australia, finishing 9th.

See also
 South Korea at the 2000 Summer Olympics

References

External links
 profile at sports-reference.com

1975 births
Living people
South Korean men's volleyball players
Place of birth missing (living people)
Volleyball players at the 1996 Summer Olympics
Volleyball players at the 2000 Summer Olympics
Olympic volleyball players of South Korea
Asian Games medalists in volleyball
Volleyball players at the 1998 Asian Games
Volleyball players at the 2002 Asian Games
Medalists at the 1998 Asian Games
Medalists at the 2002 Asian Games
Asian Games gold medalists for South Korea
Asian Games silver medalists for South Korea
Onyang Bang clan
21st-century South Korean people